The year 1882 in archaeology involved some significant events.

Explorations
 Expeditions led by Alfred Maudslay and Désiré Charnay independently arrive at the Maya site of Yaxchilan.
 Nature of site at Heuneburg identified by Eduard Paulus.

Excavations
 Carl Humann works at Smyrna (with Alfred von Domaszewski) on behalf of the Prussian Academy of Sciences and at Sam'al for the Deutsche Morgenländische Gesellschaft.
 Gaston Maspero first excavates at Lisht in Egypt, including the Pyramid of Amenemhet I.
 Panagiotis Stamatakis begins excavation of the group tomb of the warriors from Thespiae who fell in the Battle of Delium (424 BCE) in Boeotia.
 Eugène Eschassériaux excavates le camp Thénac Peu-Richard in France.

Publications
 Robert Munro - Ancient Scottish Lake Dwellings or Crannogs.

Finds
Vače situla

Miscellaneous
 The Egypt Exploration Fund is set up in the UK by Amelia Edwards and Reginald Stuart Poole.
 The Ancient Monuments Protection Act is passed in the United Kingdom and establishes protection of ancient monuments. General Pitt-Rivers is appointed the first Inspector of Ancient Monuments.

Births

Deaths

References

Archaeology
Archaeology by year
Archaeology
Archaeology